The Story Collider is a US-based non-profit group dedicated to telling true, personal stories about science. Their mission is to empower both scientists and nonscientists alike with the skills they need to tell these stories and share them through their live shows and podcast, with the goal of exploring the human side of science.

Programs

Live events 
Every year, The Story Collider produces between 40 and 50 live storytelling shows across the United States, United Kingdom, New Zealand, and Canada, featuring stories about science that are both "stand-up funny and powerfully confessional," according to The Wall Street Journal.

The organization now regularly holds shows in New York, Boston, Washington, D.C., Los Angeles, St. Louis, Atlanta, Toronto, Vancouver, and Wellington, New Zealand. In addition, The Story Collider has worked with various partners to produce one-off shows in other locations. Past and current partnerships include public radio's Studio 360 with Kurt Andersen, St. Louis Public Radio, Springer Nature, Scientific American, the American Geophysical Union, the Society for the Advancement of Chicanos/Hispanics and Native Americans in Science, the American Association for the Advancement of Science, the Gulf of Mexico Research Initiative, Fermilab, and universities such as Yale, Cambridge, and many more.

Podcast 
The weekly podcast, which started in October 2010, features two stories from the live shows in each episode and has generated over nine million downloads to date. In 2017, the podcast was included in Salon's "13 Science Podcasts for Short Attention Spans"; Business Insider's "Best Science Podcasts That Make You Smarter"; Popular Science's "The Best Science Podcasts to Make You Smarter"; The Scientist's 11 Best Science Podcasts; and Audible Feast's "Best Podcast Episodes of 2017." In 2019, The Washington Post called the stories, "devastating, delightful, and endlessly listenable." A recent study in the journal Life Sciences Education found that college students who listened to a selection of Story Collider stories over the course of a semester shifted their perception of what types of people can be scientists, and came away with better grades in the class, increased interest in science, and a vision of a possible future in it for themselves.

Workshops 
In addition to live performances, the Story Collider also conducts workshops at universities and conferences around the world with the goal of empowering scientists as storytellers. The Story Collider has worked with elite institutions like Yale, Cornell, and Cambridge University, powerhouse state schools, and small community colleges alike.

Leadership 
The Story Collider is currently led by Erin Barker, a Moth GrandSLAM-winning storyteller and writer who also produces the weekly podcast along with Zhen Qin and Misha Gajewski.

Storytellers 
As of Spring 2018, more than a thousand stories have been told at The Story Collider. Notable storytellers include:

Comedians and actors 

 Wyatt Cenac, comedian, actor, writer, director
 Aparna Nancherla, comedian, actress
 Josh Gondelman, comedian, writer for HBO's Last Week Tonight
 Jo Firestone, actress, comedian, writer
 Hallie Haglund, comedian, writer for The Daily Show and head writer for Wyatt Cenac's Problem Areas
 Myq Kaplan, comedian
 Mara Wilson, writer, actress
 Elna Baker, writer, performer
 Ophira Eisenberg, comedian and host of NPR's Ask Me Another
 Dave Hill, comedian, radio host, writer, musician, actor

Journalists and media 

 Ira Flatow, host of Science Friday
 Jon Ronson, author
 Carl Zimmer, author
 Ed Yong, author
 Joe Palca, journalist
 David Epstein, author
 Deborah Blum, author
 Susannah Cahalan, author
 Seth Mnookin, author
 Andrew Revkin, journalist
 Kelly and Zach Weinersmith, authors
 Amy Harmon, Pulitzer Prize-winning journalist 
 Emily Grossman, endocrinologist, British science TV personality
Arielle Duhaime-Ross, podcast host
Ari Daniel Shapiro, journalist

Scientists and mathematicians 

 Sara Seager, astronomer, planetary scientist
 Jo Handelsman, microbiologist and former associate director for science under President Obama
 Alan Guth, physicist
 Ken Ono, mathematician
 Moon Duchin, mathematician
 Margaret Geller, astrophysicist
 Scott Barry Kaufman, psychologist
 Alan Lightman, physicist, author
 Esther Perel, psychologist, author
 Stuart Firestein, neurobiologist, author
 Sean Carroll, cosmologist, author
Raychelle Burks, analytical chemist
Frances Colón, science diplomat and former Deputy Science & Technology Advisor to the U.S. Secretary of State

References

External links 
 
 The Story Collider, on SoundCloud
 
 
 
 

Science communication
Storytelling events
Non-profit organizations based in the United States